Mukunda Ram Mandal  is an Indian politician belonging to the Communist Party of India (Marxist) and was elected for two terms from Mathurapur, West Bengal to the Lok Sabha, lower house of the Parliament of India. He was earlier a member of the West Bengal legislative assembly.

References

1932 births
People from West Bengal
India MPs 1977–1979
India MPs 1980–1984
Lok Sabha members from West Bengal
Living people